Fred McNair (born December 11, 1968) is an American gridiron football coach and former player. He is the head football coach at Alcorn State University, a position he has held since the 2016 season. McNair played professionally as quarterback with the Toronto Argonauts in the Canadian Football League (CFL), the London Monarchs in the World League of American Football (WLAF), and the Florida Bobcats, Carolina Cobras, and Buffalo Destroyers of the Arena Football League (AFL). He played college football at Alcorn State. He is the brother of Steve McNair, a Pro Bowl quarterback in the National Football League (NFL).

Head coaching record

College

References

External links
 Alcorn State profile
 Just Sports Stats

1968 births
Living people
African-American coaches of American football
African-American players of American football
African-American players of Canadian football
Albany Firebirds players
Alcorn State Braves football coaches
Alcorn State Braves football players
American expatriate sportspeople in Canada
American football quarterbacks
Buffalo Destroyers players
Canadian football quarterbacks
Carolina Cobras players
Coaches of American football from Mississippi
Dallas Cowboys players
Florida Bobcats players
High school football coaches in Mississippi
London Monarchs players
Millsaps Majors football coaches
People from Mount Olive, Mississippi
Players of American football from Mississippi
Toronto Argonauts players